Love Me Forever or Never is a 1986 Brazilian drama film directed by Arnaldo Jabor.

Plot
Love Me Forever or Never is a psychological drama with Fernanda Torres as a newly separated woman with one child who meets her husband, Thales Pan Chacon, for a heart-to-heart discussion. They examine their feelings for one another and look back on their relationship, while arguing and talking about their fears, insecurities, pleasures and hopes. And wonder if they are still in love.

Cast
 Fernanda Torres
 Thales Pan Chacon
 Paulo Henrique Souto

Production
Love Me Forever or Never was shot in Rio de Janeiro.

Reception
1986 Cannes Film Festival where Fernanda Torres won the award for Best Actress.
IFFI Best Actor Award (Female) for Fernanda Torres at the 11th International Film Festival of India

References

External links

Love Me Forever or Never at Rotten Tomatoes

1986 romantic drama films
1986 films
Brazilian romantic drama films
Films directed by Arnaldo Jabor
Films shot in Rio de Janeiro (city)
1980s Portuguese-language films